The Australasian Performing Right Association Awards of 1989-1990 (generally known as APRA Awards) are a series of awards held in May 1991. The APRA Music Awards were presented by Australasian Performing Right Association (APRA) and the Australasian Mechanical Copyright Owners Society (AMCOS). APRA-AMCOS changed the timing of their awards ceremony from May to the previous November and hence a special presentation for 1989/90 recipients was made at the 1991 ceremony. The Australasian Performing Right Association Awards of 1989 are a series of awards held in May 1989 at the Hilton Hotel, Sydney; and are shown in the second table below.

1989 – 1990 Awards 

Only winners are noted

1989 Awards 

Only winners are noted

See also 

 Music of Australia

References

External links 

 APRA official website

1989 in Australian music
1989 music awards
APRA Awards